The 2014 Texas Longhorns football team (variously "Texas," "UT," the "Longhorns," or the "Horns") was an American football team that represented the University of Texas at Austin as a member of the Big 12 Conference in the 2014 NCAA Division I FBS football season. Texas was led by first-year head coach Charlie Strong. The team played their home games at Darrell K Royal–Texas Memorial Stadium in Austin, Texas. They finished the season 6–7, 5–4 in Big 12 play to finish in a three way tie for fourth place. They were invited to the Texas Bowl where they lost to Arkansas.

Preseason

Spring game

Recruiting

Position key

Recruits

Schedule
In 2014, Texas played three non-conference games and nine games against teams from the Big 12 during the regular season. Of these twelve games, six will be played at home, four will be away games, and two will be played at neutral sites, including the Red River Showdown against Oklahoma, which is traditionally and annually played at the Cotton Bowl in Dallas, Texas. The other game to be played at a neutral site is against UCLA, which took place at the AT&T Stadium in Arlington, Texas on September 13. Two of Texas' games were broadcast on the university's Longhorn Network – games against North Texas and Iowa State.

Personnel

Coaching staff

Roster

Game summaries

North Texas
Source:

Coverage of Texas' game against North Texas was sponsored by Southwest Airlines and was broadcast on the Longhorn Network. The Longhorns won the pregame coin toss and elected to defer, thus kicking off the football to the North Texas Mean Green to begin the game. Following an interception by defensive back Dylan Haines of North Texas quarterback Josh Greer, the Longhorns had an opportunity to score, but ended up missing a 38 yard field goal. The first quarter remained scoreless until Texas scored on a rushing touchdown by Malcolm Brown. Towards the beginning of the second quarter, Josh Greer was intercepted by the Longhorns for a second time, leading to his benching and subsequent replacement by Andrew McNulty. Texas scored on two rushing touchdowns in the second quarter by Malcolm Brown and quarterback David Ash. At the end of the first half, the Longhorns led the Mean Green 21–0.

Texas began the second half with a 75 yard drive which culminated in an eight yard touchdown pass from David Ash to wide receiver John Harris and featured a 26 yard run by Malcolm Brown. The rest of the third quarter remained scoreless from both teams, though North Texas failed to capitalize on a fumble recovery. In the fourth quarter, a long punt by North Texas punter Blake Macek led to the Longhorns beginning a drive at their own one yard line. A second fumble on a snap by David Ash was recovered by the Mean Green in the end zone, resulting in North Texas' first and only score of the game. On Texas' subsequent drive, kicker Nick Rose scored a 34 yard field goal. The following North Texas drive ended with Texas' Demarco Cobbs returning an interception for a touchdown. This was the team's final score, and the game ended 38–7 with Texas winning.

The Longhorns defense allowed only 94 yards of offense, registering as the twelfth least in school history, while the 15 yards of offense allowed marked the eighth least in school history. The defense also caught four interceptions; this was the team's highest since 2009 against Oklahoma State. Texas' record for the football season was 1–0 following the win.

BYU
Sources:

UCLA (The Advocare Cowboys Showdown)
Sources:

1st quarter scoring: UCLA - Ka'imi Fairbairn 47-yard field goal

2nd quarter scoring: UT - Nick Rose 33-yard field goal; UT - M.J. McFarland 2-yard pass from Tyrone Swoopes (Rose kick)

3rd quarter scoring:  UCLA - Nate Iese 3-yard pass from Jerry Neuheisel (Fairbairn kick)

4th quarter scoring:  UCLA - Fairbairn 25-yard field goal; UT - John Harris 8-yard pass from Swoopes (Rose kick); UCLA - Jordan Payton 33-yard pass from Neuheisel (Fairbairn kick)

Kansas

Baylor

Oklahoma

Iowa State

Kansas State

Texas Tech

West Virginia

Oklahoma State

TCU

Arkansas (Texas Bowl)

Rankings

References

Texas
Texas Longhorns football seasons
Texas Longhorns football